We Started Nothing is the debut studio album by English indie pop duo The Ting Tings. It was released on 16 May 2008 by Columbia Records. The US edition has a different cover image in several background colours. The album was also released in the United Kingdom on red vinyl limited to 2,000 copies. The US vinyl version is a standard black vinyl pressing. As of November 2014, We Started Nothing had sold 639,876 copies in the United Kingdom.

Background
According to vocalist and guitarist of The Ting Tings, Katie White:

The way we write changes with each song. "Keep Your Head" started with Jules [De Martino] on the drums, "We Walk" started with me on piano, "Shut Up and Let Me Go" started with Jules on bass, "That's Not My Name" was me ranting about my frustrations with the record industry. "Great DJ" was me playing a D chord on the guitar for hours, because that's all I could play. And then I put my finger on the wrong string, and got what I discovered was an augmented chord. And that was the riff! The lyrics described the life we were living at the time. It was about getting lost in hedonism, about forgetting that you had bailiffs knocking at your door and just surrendering to the joys of the music in a nightclub for several hours—the boys, the girls, the strings, the drums.

Singles
A double A-side single consisting of "That's Not My Name" and "Great DJ" was released as the first single from the album on 27 May 2007 through the independent label Switchflicker Records. The album's second single, "Fruit Machine", was released as a limited 500-copy run, only available for the fans at the duo's concerts. Four covers were made: one for Salford, one for Berlin, one for London and one for New York. The third single, a reissue of "Great DJ", was released on 3 March 2008. The song didn't chart until the re-release of "That's Not My Name", reaching number 33 on the UK Singles Chart.

The fourth single released from the album was the re-release of "That's Not My Name". It is so far the duo's most successful on the UK Singles Chart, reaching the top spot for one week. The single's popularity caused "Great DJ" to finally chart (two months after its release), and also caused "Shut Up and Let Me Go" to chart early (two months before its release). The song became the UK's 22nd best-selling single of 2008, selling 300,000 copies. In the United States, "That's Not My Name" reached number 33 on the Billboard Hot 100.

"Shut Up and Let Me Go" served as the fifth single from the album. Due to the popularity of "That's Not My Name", it entered the top 75 two months before its release, based on downloads. The song was officially released on 21 July 2008. It is the duo's second highest-peaking single in the UK, charting at number six, while reaching number 55 on the Billboard Hot 100.

"Be the One" was released on 13 October 2008 as the sixth single from the album, peaking at number 28 on the UK chart. The re-release of "Fruit Machine" was originally planned to be released on 9 February 2009 as the album's seventh single, but was cancelled a week before the release. "We Walk" was ultimately released as the seventh and final single on 23 February 2009, reaching number 58 in the UK. It was the band's first single not to have a 7-inch vinyl release, instead coming out on CD and 12-inch vinyl only.

Track listing
All songs written by Katie White and Jules De Martino.

Personnel
Credits adapted from the liner notes of We Started Nothing.

 Jules De Martino – production
 Dave Sardy – mixing
 Greg Gordon – mix engineering
 Matt Irwin – band photography
 Denis Kleiman – band photography

Charts

Weekly charts

Year-end charts

Certifications

Release history

References

2008 debut albums
Columbia Records albums
The Ting Tings albums
Art pop albums
European Border Breakers Award-winning albums